The 2021 Fort Worth mayoral election was held on Saturday, May 1, 2021, to decide the mayor of Fort Worth, Texas. Incumbent mayor Betsy Price, who had served as the city's mayor since 2011, announced on January 6, 2021, that she would not seek a sixth term. Ten candidates ran in the primary election.  Early voting in person began on April 19, 2021. Since no candidate received a majority of the vote on May 1, the top two finishers, Democrat Deborah Peoples and Republican Mattie Parker, advanced to a June 5, 2021 runoff election. Parker won the runoff and was elected mayor.

General election

Candidates

Declared
Brian Byrd, city councillor 
Daniel "DC" Caldwell I, educator
Mylene George, marketing coordinator
Mike Haynes, businessman
Cedric C. Kanyinda, IT Professional
Mattie Parker, non-profit executive and former chief of staff for mayor Betsy Price (Party preference: Republican)
Steve Penate, real estate broker
Deborah Peoples, former chair of the Tarrant County Democratic Party and candidate for mayor in 2019 (Party preference: Democratic)
Chris Rector, author and military veteran
Ann Zadeh, city councillor

Declined
Betsy Price, incumbent mayor (Party preference: Republican)
Dee Kelly Jr., attorney
Tim Carter, banker and chair of the board at Texas Wesleyan University

Endorsements

Results

Runoff

Candidates
Mattie Parker, former chief of staff to incumbent mayor Betsy Price (Republican)
Deborah Peoples, former chair of the Tarrant County Democratic Party (Democratic)

Endorsements

Results

References

External links
Official campaign websites
 Mattie Parker (R) for Mayor
 Deborah Peoples (D) for Mayor 

Fort Worth
Fort Worth
2021
Non-partisan elections